Mary Fitzgerald may refer to:

 Mary Fitzgerald (trade unionist) (1883–1960), Irish-born South African political activist
 Mary Fitzgerald (artist) (born 1956), Irish artist
 Mary Anne Fitzgerald (born 1945), South African-born British journalist, development aid worker and author
 Mary Fitzgerald (politician), member of the South Dakota House of Representatives

See also
 Mary Fitzgerald Square in Johannesburg, South Africa